Karen Steurs (born 27 August 1979) is a former Belgian racing cyclist. She finished second place in the Belgian National Road Race Championships in 2006.

References

External links
 

1979 births
Living people
Belgian female cyclists
People from Schoten
Cyclists from Antwerp Province